Skomorokhovo is a rural locality (a village) in Kiprevskoye Rural Settlement, Kirzhachsky District, Vladimir Oblast, Russia. The population was 4 as of 2010. There are 2 streets.

Geography 
Skomorokhovo is located on the Shorna River, 27 km northeast of Kirzhach (the district's administrative centre) by road. Yasnaya Polyana is the nearest rural locality.

References 

Rural localities in Kirzhachsky District